Baywatch Nights is an American science-fiction mystery drama television series that aired in syndication from 1995 to 1997. Created by Douglas Schwartz, David Hasselhoff, and Gregory J. Bonann, the series is a spin-off from the television series, Baywatch.

Synopsis
The original premise of the series was that during a midlife crisis, Sgt. Garner Ellerbee (Gregory Alan Williams), who was the resident police officer of Baywatch since the beginning of the series, decides to quit his job as a police officer and form a detective agency. Mitch Buchannon (David Hasselhoff), his friend from Baywatch, joins to support him and they are, in turn, joined by a detective named Ryan McBride (Angie Harmon). Singer Lou Rawls, who starred in the first season, performed the series theme song, "After the Sun Goes Down", alongside David Hasselhoff. Rawls played the role of Lou Raymond, owner of the nightclub where the detective agency rented its office. Midway into the first season, the series added two new cast members: Eddie Cibrian and Donna D'Errico.

For the second season, facing slipping ratings, which were never as good as the original series, the producers decided to switch to a science-fiction format (inspired by the success of The X-Files). Gregory Alan Williams left the series and was replaced by Dorian Gregory as Diamont Teague, a paranormal expert. The new format did not help the series and it was canceled after the second season. The character Donna Marco was later carried over to the original Baywatch series afterwards.

Episodes

Cast
 David Hasselhoff as Mitch Buchannon
 Gregory Alan Williams as Garner Ellerbee (season one)
 Angie Harmon as Ryan McBride
 Lisa Stahl as Destiny Desimone (episodes 1–10)
 Lou Rawls as Lou Raymond (season 1)
 Eddie Cibrian as Griff Walker (episodes 11–44)
 Donna D'Errico as Donna Marco (episodes 11–44)
 Dorian Gregory as Diamont Teague (season 2)

Guests from Baywatch
 Billy Warlock as Eddie Kramer (guest-starring in episode 14)
 Yasmine Bleeth as Caroline Holden (guest-starring in episode 16)
 Alexandra Paul as Stephanie Holden (guest-starring in episode 41)
 Michael Newman as Mike "Newmie" Newman (guest-starring in episodes 14, 16, and 30)

Home video releases
Shock Entertainment released both seasons on DVD in Region 4 (Australia) on September 18, 2013.

References

External links
 
 

1995 American television series debuts
1997 American television series endings
1990s American crime drama television series
1990s American science fiction television series
American action television series
American television spin-offs
Nights
English-language television shows
First-run syndicated television programs in the United States
Occult detective fiction
Television series by Fremantle (company)